formerly  is a Japanese media and licensed broadcasting holding company. It is the parent company of the television network  and radio network . It has a 28-affiliate television network called JNN (Japan News Network), as well as a 34-affiliate radio network called JRN (Japan Radio Network).

TBS produced the game show Takeshi's Castle and has also broadcast the Ultra Series programs and Sasuke (Ninja Warrior),  whose format would inspire similar programs outside Japan.

TBS is a member of the Mitsui keiretsu and has substantial relations with The Mainichi Newspapers Co. despite the Mainichi's lack of shareholding.

History

 May 1951 -  was founded in Kasumigaseki, Chiyoda, Tokyo, Japan.
 December 25, 1951 - KRT started radio broadcasting (1130 kHz, 50 kW, until July 1953) from Yurakucho, Chiyoda, Tokyo, and the frequency changed to 950 kHz.
 April 1955 - KRT started TV broadcasting (JOKR-TV, Channel 6) from Akasaka-Hitotsukicho, Minato, Tokyo.
 August 1, 1959 - Japan News Network (JNN) is formed.
 November 29, 1960 - KRT was renamed , and the headquarters and radio studio were moved to the main building in Akasaka.
 August 1961 - TBS unveils the cursive logo, after the renaming of Tokyo Broadcasting System from KRT.
 1971 - TBS Radio's transmitter power was increased to 100 kW.
 March 31, 1975 - Asahi Broadcasting Corporation (ABC) dropped out JNN and Mainichi Broadcasting System (MBS) joined the news network due to ownership issues with ABC. Since then, MBS has been an affiliated TV station of JNN in Osaka and Kansai region.
 November 23, 1978 - The frequency for TBS Radio was moved to 954 kHz.
 May 2, 1986 - TBS starts broadcasting the game show Takeshi's Castle.
 1989 - TBS became culpable in the Sakamoto family murder by Aum Shinrikyo, resulting in complaints against the network after the case was solved several years later.
 October 19, 1990 - The last-ever episode of Takeshi's Castle was broadcast on TBS.
 September 20, 1991 - TBS enters into an agreement with CBS News in the U.S. for newscasts and satellite relays. Following a short-lived logo for 30 years.
 October 3, 1994 - The present headquarters, TBS Broadcasting Center, were completed next to the old headquarters (later renamed as Akasaka Media Building until its demolition in 2003). They are called "Big Hat (ビッグハット)". Nine months after the third logo was unveiled.
April 1, 1998 - JNN News Bird starts broadcasting. In 2006, the channel was renamed TBS News Bird.
 February 2000 - TBS adopts a symbol based on the Kanji symbol for "person".
 March 21, 2000 - TBS founded TBS Radio & Communications Inc. (株式会社ティ・ビー・エス・ラジオ・アンド・コミュニケーションズ→株式会社TBSラジオ&コミュニケーションズ), TBS Entertainment Inc. (株式会社ティ・ビー・エス・エンタテインメント), and TBS Sports Inc. (株式会社ティ・ビー・エス・スポーツ), and founded TBS Live Inc. (株式会社ティ・ビー・エス・ライブ) the next day. On October 1, 2001, TBS succeeded the radio station to TBS Radio & Communications, and changed callsign of TV station (JOKR-TV → JORX-TV).
 July 1, 2002 - TBS ch. starts broadcasting on pay television.
 October 1, 2004 - TBS Entertainment merged TBS Sports and TBS Live, and changed the corporate name to Tokyo Broadcasting System Television, Inc. (株式会社TBSテレビ).
 October 13, 2005 - Rakuten Inc. announced that it bought 15.46 percent stake in TBS, bringing it up to 19%.
 After over a month and a half of worries over a possible hostile takeover, Rakuten withdrew its bid for TBS on December 1 and planned to form a business alliance with the broadcast company instead.
 April 1, 2006 - Digital terrestrial broadcasts commence.
 April 1, 2009 - TBS became a certified broadcast holding company named Tokyo Broadcasting System Holdings, Inc.. TV broadcasting business and culture business were taken over by Tokyo Broadcasting System Television, Inc. and the letters TBS became in use for the abbreviation of the subsidiary company.
 March 11, 2011 - During the 2011 Tōhoku earthquake and tsunami, a news special program was broadcast without commercials from the earthquake in three days.
 December 1, 2011 - TBS sold the Yokohama BayStars, a Nippon Professional Baseball team to DeNA. DeNA will buy 66.92 percent of the team's stock for 6.5 billion yen from TBS. TBS will retain a 2.31 percent ownership stake in the team.
 April 1, 2016 - TBS Holdings subsidiary, TBS Radio and Communications renamed TBS Radio.
 April 1, 2020 - Four months after the 2019 merger of CBS and Viacom, TBS Holdings and TV Asahi Holdings repartnered with CBS Entertainment Group via WarnerMedia Studios & Networks (inc. The CW, a limited liability joint venture between CBS and WarnerMedia), since CBS News and CNN partnered with JNN and ANN for 56 years. Following the fourth logo unveiled for 26 years.
 October 1, 2020: Tokyo Broadcasting System Holdings, Inc. was renamed TBS Holdings, Inc., to commemorate 70th anniversary of the company.

Coverage

Current

Broadcasting rights

Football

Soccer 
 FIFA
 National teams
 Men's :
 FIFA World Cup (including qualifiers for Europe (all matches) and Asia (selected matches)
 Japan national football team
 Japan national under-23 football team

Volleyball 
FIVB
FIVB Volleyball Men's World Championship
FIVB Volleyball Women's World Championship

Golf 
 The Masters

Multi-sport events 
 IAAF World Championships in Athletics
 Summer Olympic Games
 Winter Olympic Games

Announcers

Programs
Below is a selection of the many programs that the network has broadcast.
Kinniku Banzuke (Unbeatable Banzuke in America) a former obstacle based game show that inspired Sasuke 
Sasuke (American Ninja Warrior in the United States) an obstacle course based game show that was originally part of Kinniku Banzuke
Kunoichi Sasuke's female counterpart
All Star Thanksgiving Festival (Spring/Fall)
The Best Ten (1978-1989)
Another World
Days of Our Lives
Passions
Masahiro Nakai's Friday Smarts
Music Television
Quiz ¥20,000,000 Money Drop
Santa Barbara
Sunset Beach
Mino Monta Asa Zuba!
Sanma's Super Karakuri-TV
Tokyo Friend Park II
Count Down TV
The World Heritage
Dragon Zakura
Princess Resurrection
Japan Cable Awards
Japan Record Awards
Tokyo Music Festival
Food Battle Club
It's 8 o'clock! Everyone's Gathered (1969-1985)
Takeshi's Castle
Newscope → JNN Evening News → Evening 5 → THE NEWS → N Studio
Karei-naru Ichizoku''' - TBS 55th anniversary drama starring Takuya Kimura (SMAP)LincolnUtaban → The Music HourSamurai Baseball - baseball gamesMasters TournamentQuiz DerbyWe asked 100 people (1979-1992)Toray Pan Pacific OpenFIVB Volleyball Men's World Championship, FIVB Volleyball Women's World Championship, FIVB Volleyball World LeagueIAAF World Championships in Athletics (since 1997, IAAF Official Broadcaster)Happy family planSurvivorAh, You're really Gone Now. This TV film  was selected at the 49ème Festival de télévision de Monte-Carlo in Monte-Carlo in June 2009. It obtained the special commendation of the SIGNIS Jury.Hiroshima Showa 20 nen 8 Gatsu Muika (2005)Japanese Americans (2010) (2011)Ginayon (1985-2012 (present))
 Produce 101 Japan (2019)

Anime programming

 The Idolmaster''

Criticism

Sakamoto family murders 
TBS was accused of failing to protect its sources in October 1989, when it taped an interview with Tsutsumi Sakamoto regarding his investigations into the Aum Shinrikyo sect. The network secretly showed a video of the interview to Aum members without Sakamoto's knowledge. Aum officials then pressured TBS to cancel the planned broadcast of the interview, but Sakamoto, his wife and child were murdered by Aum members on 3 November.

See also
 Hobankyo - Organization based in Japan that enforces TBS copyright issues.

Notes

References

External links
TBS Television - 

1951 establishments in Japan
 
Holding companies based in Tokyo
Japan News Network
Liberal media in Japan
Mass media companies based in Tokyo
Mitsui
Shochiku
Television in Tokyo
Television networks in Japan